The 2014 United States House of Representatives elections in Rhode Island were held on November 4, 2014, to elect the two U.S. representatives from the state of Rhode Island, apportioned according to the 2010 United States census. The elections coincided with the elections of other federal and state offices, including an election to the U.S. Senate and the election for governor.

Overview
Results of the 2014 United States House of Representatives elections in Rhode Island by district:

District 1

The 1st district is located in eastern Rhode Island and includes all of Bristol and Newport counties, along with parts of Providence County, including most of the city of Providence. The incumbent is Democrat David Cicilline, who has represented the district since 2011. He was re-elected with 53% of the vote in 2012 and the district has a PVI of D+15.

Former United States Army Captain Matthew Fecteau ran against Cicilline in the Democratic primary.

Former United States Marine and former JPMorgan Chase employee Cormick Lynch and Brown University medical student Stanford Tran competed for the Republican nomination. Republican former State Representative John J. Loughlin, Jr., who lost to Cicilline in 2010, had considered running, but decided against it.

Jonathan Maciel also filed to run as an Independent.

Primary results

General election

District 2

The 2nd district is located in southern and western Rhode Island and includes all of Kent and Washington counties, along with parts of Providence County, including the city of Cranston and parts of the city of Providence. The incumbent is Democrat James Langevin, who has represented the district since 2001. He was re-elected with 56% of the vote in 2012 and the district has a PVI of D+8.

Langevin was unopposed for the Democratic nomination. Mark Zaccaria, a former Chairman of the Rhode Island Republican Party and the nominee for the seat in 2008 and 2010, attempted to convince a dozen Republicans to run, all of whom turned him down. Ultimately, house contractor and casino worker Rhue Reis was the only person to file for the nomination.

Primary results

General election

References

External links
U.S. House elections in Rhode Island, 2014 at Ballotpedia
Campaign contributions at OpenSecrets

2014
Rhode Island
United States House